Moustafa Matola (born 27 November 1948) is a Malawian sprinter. He competed in the men's 100 metres at the 1972 Summer Olympics.

References

1948 births
Living people
Athletes (track and field) at the 1972 Summer Olympics
Malawian male sprinters
Olympic athletes of Malawi
Place of birth missing (living people)